USCGC Hemlock (WAGL-217) was a lighthouse tender in commission in the fleet of the United States Lighthouse Service as USLHT Hemlock from 1934 to 1939, and in the fleet of the United States Coast Guard as USCGC Hemlock from 1939 to 1958. During World War II, she was given the additional designation (WAGL-217).

History
She was laid down in 1933 at the Seattle shipyard of the Berg Shipbuilding Company. She was specifically designed for Alaska with a double-bottom and larger fuel tanks. She was launched on 23 January 1934, acquired by the United States Lighthouse Service in March 1934, and commissioned later that year. Assigned to the 16th Lighthouse District, she worked as a lighthouse tender in the waters surrounding the Territory of Alaska. On 1 July 1939, the U.S. Lighthouse Service was abolished and the United States Coast Guard took over its responsibilities and assets; and Hemlock became part of the Coast Guard fleet as USCGC Hemlock. She continued to operate out of Ketchikan, Territory of Alaska as her home-port.

During World War II, she was assigned to the Alaska Sector of the 13th Naval District (headquartered at Puget Sound Naval Shipyard) where she was one of the few ships then in newly-appointed Captain R.C. Parker's small "Alaskan Navy" which consisted of the gunboat and flagship , the cutter , three converted patrol craft, and her sister lighthouse tenders,  and USCG Cedar. She was decommissioned in 1958. She was sold on August 2, 1961 and later served as a merchant ship.

References

1934 ships
Ships of the United States Coast Guard
Ships of the United States Lighthouse Service
Lighthouse tenders of the United States
World War II auxiliary ships of the United States
Ships of the Aleutian Islands campaign
Ships built in Seattle